CFRS-DT, virtual channel 4.1 (VHF digital channel 13), is a Noovo owned-and-operated television station licensed to Saguenay, Quebec, Canada, operating as a de facto semi-satellite of Montreal flagship CFJP-DT. The station is owned by the Bell Media subsidiary of BCE Inc. CFRS-DT's studios are located on Rue Racine Est (co-located with sister stations CFIX-FM and CJAB-FM) in the former city of Chicoutimi, and its transmitter is located atop Mount Valin. On cable, the station is available on Vidéotron channel 5 and in high-definition on digital channel 605.

History
The station was launched in 1986 by local broadcaster Radio Saguenay, as a sister station of Radio-Canada affiliate CKRS-TV (now Radio-Canada O&O CKTV-DT). Until the creation of the "megacity" of Saguenay in 2002, it was licensed to Jonquière.

Both stations were acquired by Cogeco in 1998, with CFRS becoming a TQS owned-and-operated station in 2001 when Cogeco bought controlling interest in the network. CFRS was part of V's takeover by Remstar in 2008. When TQS rebranded as V on August 31, 2009, CFRS dropped all non-network programming and became a de facto repeater of Montreal-based flagship CFJP-TV.

The station began broadcasting exclusively in digital on September 1, 2011, after receiving authorization from the CRTC.

Former local programming
 Le Grand Journal Saguenay-Lac-St-Jean (1989–Fall 2009) - Local news show, aired weekdays at 5:30 p.m.
 Les Infos (Fall 2008–Fall 2009) - Two-minute local news capsules, aired weekdays at 6:45 a.m., 7:30 a.m., 7:45 a.m., 8:30 a.m., and 11:56 a.m.
 Le Reflet du Saguenay-Lac-St-Jean (Fall 2008–Fall 2009) - Weekly news summary with feature reports, airs Sundays at 9:30 a.m.

References

External links
 

FRS
FRS
Television channels and stations established in 1986
1986 establishments in Quebec